Mian Tang (also Romanized as Mīān Tang, Meyān Tang, and Miyān-i-Tang; also known as Naotang, Nāv Tang, and Nūtang) is a village in Howmeh-ye Kerend Rural District, in the Central District of Dalahu County, Kermanshah Province, Iran. At the 2006 census, its population was 60, in 13 families.

References 

Populated places in Dalahu County